Iopolis or Ione was a town on Mount Silpion near Antioch, where Io was worshipped as a moon goddess.

Archaeological sites in Hatay Province